Atwima-Nwabiagya is one of the constituencies represented in the Parliament of Ghana. It elects one Member of Parliament (MP) by the first past the post system of election. Atwima-Nwabiagya is located in the Atwima Nwabiagya District  of the Ashanti Region of Ghana. In 2012 the constituency was split into the Atwima Nwabiagya South and the Atwima Nwabiagya North constituencies.

Boundaries
The seat is located within the Atwima District of the Ashanti Region of Ghana.

Members of Parliament

Elections

See also
List of Ghana Parliament constituencies

References 

Parliamentary constituencies in the Ashanti Region